The Cholame Hills are a low mountain range in extreme southeastern Monterey County, California.

They are a northern extension of the Temblor Range, both of the California Coast Ranges System.

To the south of the range lie California State Route 46 and the town of Cholame, California.

See also
 California Flats Solar Project — proposed for the area

References 

Hills of California
Mountain ranges of Monterey County, California
Temblor Range
California Coast Ranges